Mohamed Bilili Bangura (born May 1, 1994) is a Sierra Leonean midfielder that plays for Swedish Division 2 club Härnösands FF, but he also functions defensive midfielder in some matches for the club as well. He played for Kallon FC Before taking on a tryout with Swedish club Härnösands FF in 2015.

Club career
Mohamed Bilili Bangura started his career with former Sierra Leone international star footballer club Kallon FC in 2011 and he grew into a huge name in the club over the years before he joined his brother Abdul Bangura former Swedish club Härnösands FF in 2015 for the season. He clocked all the matches for the club and ended as one of the best midfielder for Härnösands FF in the Swedish Norraland Division 2 season.

References
 http://blogg.mittmedia.se/90minuter/2015/01/28/90-minuter-avslojar-hff-varvar-hogklassig-mittback/
 http://slconcordtimes.com/bangura-undergoes-trials-with-harnosands-ff/
 http://www3.idrottonline.se/HarnosandsFF-Fotboll/Foreningen/Lagsidor/Div2/Truppen/

1994 births
Living people
Sierra Leonean footballers
Association football midfielders
Sportspeople from Freetown
Härnösands FF players
Sierra Leone international footballers